Serena Gibbs (born 3 June 2000) is an Australian rules footballer playing for  in the AFL Women's (AFLW).

Junior career 
As a junior, Gibbs initially played netball in the Victorian state league. She switched to football in 2019 on the recommendation of the mother of Gibbs' friend Emerson Woods. (Gibbs and Woods would later reunite as teammates at Carlton). Gibbs began playing for the Eastern Ranges in the NAB League Girls. Although she lacked the football knowledge of more experienced players, she nevertheless had a successful season, leading the club's goalkicking with 11 goals and ranking among the top three players in the club's best and fairest.

Her performance in a game against Melbourne University, in which she kicked two goals and took four marks against a defence featuring AFLW players, was particularly noted for establishing her footballing potential to clubs' scouts.

AFLW career 
Gibbs was selected by Carlton with pick 44 in the 2019 AFLW draft, their fourth selection. In 2020, she focused on developing her football skills and gym work, but ultimately would not play any AFLW matches in her first year. In the lead-up to the 2021 season, Gibbs played as Carlton's full-forward in a practice match against , and kicked two goals in a strong display. Carlton's co-captain Kerryn Harrington predicted Gibbs would "get her opportunity" in 2021; she went on to make her AFLW debut in round 5 against .

In March 2023, Gibbs was traded to Fremantle.

References

External links 

Living people
2000 births
Australian rules footballers from Victoria (Australia)
Eastern Ranges players
Carlton Football Club (AFLW) players